Sabzdasht Rural District may refer to:
 Sabzdasht Rural District (Hamadan Province)
 Sabzdasht Rural District (Bafq County), Yazd province